The Gates of Cairo were gates at portals in the city walls of medieval Islamic Cairo, within the present day city of Cairo, Egypt.

The city of Cairo was founded in 969 CE by  Gawhar al-Siqilli, as the new royal city of the Fatimid Caliphate, with a defensive wall. In 1092, the Fatimids built a second wall around Cairo. The double walled city had a significant number of fortified gates at the portals protecting both the inner and outer city areas. The primary purpose was defense, but they also differentiated the various social and economic classes' districts and movements. Many gate surrounds were carved artistic elements  and embellished  decorative features, representing the ruler's and city's victories, power, faith, and influence. The gates were influenced by the designs of gates that the Fatimids had built in Tunisia, most prominently the main gate to Mahdia.

Bāb is Arabic for "door" or "entrance"; from bawwaba (trans. "to divide into chapters or sections").

Gates

Cairo's medieval city gates include:
 (the Gate of the Shore), built in 1174 by Bahā’ al-Dīn Qaraqūsh, near northwest corner in the northern wall; destroyed during the city modernization by Muḩammad ‘Alī in early 19th century.
 (the Gate of Blessedness?) I, built by Jawhar al-Şaqalī; destroyed in 1936.
 II, built by Şalāh al-Din in 1184; part of the eastern wall which was built far to the east to allow expansion of the city eastward from the Nile.
 (the Gate of Succour), in the southern Cairo wall at the hall where the tomb of Set Seada is located.
 - finished in the year 1087, remains at the northern end of Muizz Street
 (the New Gate), built in 1170 in the eastern wall; still remains.
 (the Gate of the Attacker)
 (Ḩusayniyyah Gate, referring to a district)
 (the Gate of Creation)

 (the Gate of Victory) finished in 969 CE, replaced circa 1121 by the Bab al-'Izz (Gate of Prosperity), remains in Muizz Street district
 (the Gate of the Bridge)
 (the Gate of Alkali)
 (attributed to the name of a tribe)
 (the Gate of the Chain)
 (the Gate of the Secret)
 (the Gate of Success)
 (Khān al-Khalīlī Gate, referring to a district)
 (Gate of Happiness)
 (Gate of the Milky Way)
, the last remaining southern gate from the walls of 11th and 12th century Fatimid Cairo.

See also
Fatimid Caliphate
Islamic Cairo
Muizz Street - Cairo

References

External links 

 
Cairo
Gates in Egypt
Buildings and structures in Cairo
Tourist attractions in Cairo
Medieval Cairo